Duleep Cricket School is a cricket ground in Porbandar, Saurashtra. The ground is also home ground of Saurashtra cricket team. The ground hosted a six cricket matches from 1968 to 1986 before falling of the record. The ground is named after great Indian cricketer and Prince of Nawanagar Kumar Shri Duleepsinhji.

In 2011, Jay Mehta, the co-owner of Kolkata Knight Riders, along with the Porbandar District Cricket Association decided to develop the Duleep Cricket School and to regain the domestic status. The proposal includes built outfield, dressing rooms, water-logging problems as well as pavilion and indoor cricket facilities.

References

External links
 Cricinfo
 Cricketarchive 
 Wikimapia

Cricket grounds in Saurashtra (region)
Sports venues in Saurashtra (region)
Porbandar
Sports venues completed in 1947
1947 establishments in India
20th-century architecture in India